Under Siege (Live in Barcelona) is the first live home video by Brazilian Thrash metal band Sepultura, released in 1992 . Directed by Stephen Payne and produced by Stephen Malit, it was recorded during their mid-1991 European Arise tour and prominently features songs from the said album. Barcelona was chosen by Payne as he had heard the crowds there were the best in Europe.  This proved to be true.  Interspersed between the songs are interviews with the band members in which they discuss their religious views, how they got together and growing up in Belo Horizonte. The video was later remastered and released as part of Chaos DVD.

Track listing

Tracks 1–4, 6 and 11 from the album Arise.
Tracks 5, 7 and 10 are from the album Beneath the Remains.
Track 8 is from the album Schizophrenia.
Track 9 is from the album Morbid Visions.

 "Intro" is an actual instrumental song performed by the band, rather than a pre-recorded track.
 The audio from seven of the tracks (1, 2, 5–9) appear on the double-disc album The Roots of Sepultura.

The performance of "Orgasmatron" from this video is mixed with backstage footage of the band and crew members, and was shown on TV as a music video to promote the album, but never saw official single release.

Artwork
The video was released in a card slipcase in both PAL and NTSC territories. The artwork simply shows the band's thorned 'S' logo on a muddy background. Although it appears on many of the band's CDs, this is the first time the logo has been used on cover artwork.

Personnel
 Max Cavalera – lead vocals, rhythm guitar
 Andreas Kisser – lead guitar
 Paulo Jr. – bass
 Igor Cavalera – drums

Sepultura Road Crew
Tour Manager – Gloria "The General" Cavalera
Lights – Marcelo "Raps"
Sound – Nino "Fishman"
Stage Manager – Scott "Goody"
Monitors – Luciano "Macaroni"
Guitar Technicians – Silvio "Bibica" & Scott "Goody"
Bass Tech – Scott "Porno"
Drum Tech – Eddie "Neguzinho"
Stage Hand – Scott "Punisher"
Lighting design – Christian "Cazuza"
Directed by Stephen Payne
Produced by Stephen Malitsky

Sepultura video albums
1992 video albums
Live video albums
1992 live albums
Sepultura live albums